Setolovo is a rural locality (a selo) and the administrative center of Setolovskoye Rural Settlement, Pochepsky District, Bryansk Oblast, Russia.  In the 19th century the village was part of Alexeevskaya volost, Mglinsky Uyezd, Chernigov Governorate. The population was 494 as of 2010. There are 8 streets.

Geography 
Setolovo is located 9 km north of Pochep (the district's administrative centre) by road. Azarovo is the nearest rural locality.

References 

Rural localities in Pochepsky District